Pilocarpus microphyllus, the Maranham Jaborandi, is a plant species in the genus Pilocarpus found native to several states in northern Brazil.

Commercial production of the alkaloid  muscarinic receptor agonist pilocarpine is derived entirely from the leaves of the shrub.

See also 
 Vegetation of Minas Gerais

References

External links 

Plants described in 1893
Zanthoxyloideae